Johnson-Marshall is a surname. Notable people with the surname include:

 Percy Johnson-Marshall (1915–1993), British urban designer
 Stirrat Johnson-Marshall (1912–1981), British architect 
 Felix Johnson-Marshall, father of Stirrat and Percy

Compound surnames